Jefferson is an unincorporated community in Houston County, Minnesota.

The first settlement at Jefferson was made in 1847.

Jefferson Township has an area of 90.13 km.

Notes

Unincorporated communities in Houston County, Minnesota
Unincorporated communities in Minnesota